Black Heat was a 1970s funk band founded by King Raymond Green and discovered by Phillip Guilbeau. Their albums include Black Heat (with guest artist David "Fathead" Newman), No Time To Burn and Keep On Runnin'. The group had one hit single, "No Time to Burn", which reached #46 on the U.S. Billboard Black Singles chart. A CD re-issue of their first two albums was released by Label M in 2001 under the title, Declassified Grooves. They had recently appeared at a memorial concert for Joel Dorn their original producer at Atlantic Records. It was the first time they had reunited in over 34 years.

Members
Johnell Gray - Keyboards, Vocals
Bradley Owens - Guitar, Vocals
Chip Jones - Bass Guitar, Vocals
King Raymond Green - Congas, Timbales, Harmonica and Vocals
Esco Cromer - Drums, Vocals
Ray Thompson - Woodwinds
Rodney Edwards - Trumpet
Ken Carroll - Tenor Sax

Guest musician
Ralph MacDonald 
David Newman

Discography
Black Heat (Atlantic Records, 1972)
No Time to Burn (Atlantic, 1974) U.S. R&B #58, U.S. #201
Keep on Runnin (Atlantic, 1975) U.S. R&B #51

References

External links
http://www.last.fm/music/Black+Heat
http://www.discogs.com/artist/Black+Heat

American funk musical groups